Guillermo Dávila (born 18 March 1955, in Bailadores) is a Venezuelan actor and singer who has acted in many telenovelas.

Biography
After starting his career in theatre in the 1970s, Dávila first gained national fame in after starring in the telenovela Ligia Elena together with its sequel Nacho. His international fame started rising then, and in 1984, he travelled to Puerto Rico, where he starred alongside Ivonne Goderich in the 1984 soap opera Diana Carolina for WAPA-TV. The series' title song, "Toda La Luz", became a number-one hit.

Dávila continued starring in telenovelas, and in 1992, he gained fame once more after starring in Cara Sucia.

As a singer, Dávila has released over ten albums, some of which reached international platinum or gold status. He sang the songs on the soundtracks for nearly all the soap operas he starred in.

Dávila had an international hit in 1989 when he recorded a duet with pop singer Kiara; the single was called "Tesoro Mío" (My Treasure) and was from the soap opera telenovela La Revancha.  His first album of his new stage, Tu Corazón, followed in 1990.

Illness
On 2 November 2014, Davila arrived at Luis Muñoz Marín International Airport in San Juan, Puerto Rico on a flight from Miami International Airport, apparently affected by a cold. His condition worsened, however, and he was later hospitalized at Centro Medico hospital in San Juan under strict secrecy. He was diagnosed with pneumonia and was in serious condition. Venezuelan entertainer Carlos Mata visited Davila and posted online that Davila was breathing artificially, but Davila's wife Laura Echevarria declared on 7 November, days after arriving to Puerto Rico to be by her husband's bedside, that Davila continued being in stable condition.
On 16 November, Davila was much better and was expected to remain in good condition.

Davila later recuperated and was able to perform in Puerto Rico on 21 February 2015.

Discography
Guillermo Dávila (1982 Venezuela release as Sono-Rodven) (1983 U.S. release as Top Hits)
Un Poco de Amor (1983 Venezuela release as Sono-Rodven) (1984 U.S. release as Rodven USA)
Definitivamente (1984 Venezuela release as Sono-Rodven) (1985 U.S. release as Rodven USA)
Cantaré Para Ti (1985 Venezuela release as Sono-Rodven) (1986 U.S. release as Rodven USA)
Guillermo Dávila 5 (1988) (1990 U.S. release as Tú Corazón)
Éxitos Y Algo Más (1990)
Tuyo (1990) (1991 U.S. release)
Por Amarte Tanto (1992)
Dulce Enemiga Y Otros Éxitos De Guillermo Dávila (1995)
Días de Pasión (1998)

Singles

Telenovelas
 1982: Ligia Elena as Ignacio Ramón Nacho Gamboa
 1983: Nacho as Ignacio Ramón Nacho Gamboa
 1984: Diana Carolina
 1985: Cantaré para ti
 1986: El Sol Sale Para Todos
 1989: Fabiola as Carlos Alberto
 1990: Adorable Mónica as Luis Alfredo
 1992: Cara Sucia as Miguel Ángel González De la Vega
 1995: Dulce Enemiga as Julio Cesar Guerrero
 1997: Contra Viento y Marea as Sebastián León
 1999: Sueños as Jose Carlos de la Vega
 2001: Felina as Abel
 2004: Cosita Rica as Gastón
 2006: Ciudad Bendita as Macario
 2007: Toda una dama as Juan Jose Reyes 'JJ'
 2008: Nadie me dirá como quererte as Francisco Alonso
 2013: Las Bandidas as Rodrigo Irazábal

References

1955 births
Living people
Male actors from Caracas
Singers from Caracas
Venezuelan male telenovela actors
Rodven Records artists
Venezuelan pop singers
Latin pop singers
20th-century Venezuelan male actors
20th-century Venezuelan  male  singers
21st-century Venezuelan male actors
21st-century Venezuelan male  singers